Joseph Gentry "Jeep" Jessup (July 11, 1914 – March 23, 1998) was an American baseball pitcher in the Negro leagues. He played from 1940 to 1948 with the Birmingham Black Barons and  Chicago American Giants.

References

External links
 and Seamheads

1914 births
1998 deaths
African-American baseball players
Baseball players from North Carolina
Birmingham Black Barons players
Carman Cardinals players
Chicago American Giants players
Navegantes del Magallanes players
American expatriate baseball players in Venezuela
People from Mount Airy, North Carolina
Sportspeople from Springfield, Missouri
20th-century African-American sportspeople
Baseball pitchers